The elm cultivar Ulmus 'Planeroides' [:Planera-like elm] was described by Carrière in the Revue horticole, 1875. It was considered "possibly Ulmus carpinifolia" [:U. minor ] by Green. 

Not to be confused with Späth's U. montana viminalis which, though "also distributed under the name Planera aquatica", has osier-like leaves, Planera being the old name for Zelkova, a close relative of elm with willow-like leaves.

Description
The tree was described as having leaves like Planera aquatica.

Pests and diseases
Most field elm clones are susceptible to Dutch elm disease.

Cultivation
No specimens are known to survive.

Putative specimen
A pruned elm with Planera-like leaves, possibly the cultivar 'Planeroides', stands in Stanford Avenue, Brighton.

References

Ulmus articles with images
Ulmus
Missing elm cultivars